Knook is a village in Wiltshire, England.

Knook may also refer to:

Peter Knook, a character in the children's book The Life and Adventures of Santa Claus
Knook, a type of crochet hook
Kosy Knook Court, a bungalow court in Pasadena, California, United States